Abraham Roqueñi Iglesias (born April 16, 1978) is a Spanish welterweight kickboxer. He was the K-1 MAX Spain 2004 tournament winner, and is a former ISKA, WAKO and WFCA world champion. He holds notable wins over Gago Drago, Luis Reis, Andy Souwer, Giga Chikadze, and Artur Kyshenko.

Career
Roqueñi began practicing martial arts with karate at the age of 7, and now holds a 3rd dan black belt in the discipline. He began kickboxing at 12 and had his first amateur fight as a 16-year-old.

Early in his career, he became the Iberian, Spanish and European champion before gaining further international recognition when he won the K-1 MAX Spain 2004 eight-man tournament on December 18, 2004. He knocked out Antonio Postigo and Willy Borrel in the quarter-finals and semi-finals, respectively, before taking a decision over Luis Reis in the final.

Roqueñi won the WAKO World Lowkick Championship on October 22, 2005, when he defeated Wallid Haddad. He made three defences of this title, against Ibrahim Tamazaev, Radhouane Amoulibi and Kevin Harper, over the course of the next year before winning his second world title on June 30, 2007, by beating Thai fighter Kit Sitphonlek by decision for the WFCA World Muay Thai Championship. He then lost this belt to Mohammed Rahhaoui on May 10, 2008.

On December 7, 2007, Roqueñi knocked out Franck Pétin to win the WFCA World Full Contact Championship. He then won his fourth world title on April 11, 2009, by KOing Tim Thomas for the ISKA World title at -70 kg.

On February 5, 2011, he caused a huge upset by defeating K-1 star Andy Souwer in Málaga, Spain. Roqueñi knocked Souwer down in round 2 en route to a decision win. Following this, he was invited to compete in the It's Showtime organization and made his promotional debut at Fix Events & Fightclub Group presents: It's Showtime 2011 on June 18, 2011, and beat Gago Drago by majority decision.

In late 2011, he joined the Thai Fight 2011 70 kg Tournament. He was unable to make it past the semi-final stage, however, as he was defeated by Frank Giorgi on November 27, 2011, in Bangkok, Thailand.

On January 21, 2012, he lost a unanimous decision to pound for pound #1 Giorgio Petrosyan in Milan, Italy.

He won the face versus Albert Kraus on April 28, 2012, in Torrelavega, Spain.

He was scheduled to fight Yury Bessmertny in Nitra, Slovakia on October 27, 2012, but Bessmertny pulled out of the fight due to injury.

He defeated Xu Yan by unanimous decision in a tournament reserve bout at the K-1 World MAX 2012 World Championship Tournament Final in Athens, Greece on December 15, 2012.

On February 3, 2013, he will fight Dutch-based Georgian Giga Chikadze at Street Culture Fight Night 2 in Tenerife, Spain.

Roqueñi took a split decision win over Artur Kyshenko at Enfusion Live: Barcelona in Barcelona, Spain on March 9, 2012.

He beat Elam Ngor by disqualification at Enfusion Live: Tenerife in Tenerife, Spain on July 13, 2013. The fight was ruled a draw after three rounds and was set to go to an extension round to decide the victor, but Ngor apparently felt that he had already done enough and would be unable to beat Roqueñi on points in front of Spanish judges and so he left the ring, resulting in the DQ.

He was set to fight at the K-1 World MAX 2013 World Championship Tournament Final 16 in Majorca, Spain on September 14, 2013. However, he withdrew from the tournament as Street Culture Promotions, the co-promoter of the event, had not paid him for his fights with Xu Yan and Artur Kyshenko.

He beat Emmanuel Horta Vavares by first-round KO in the quarter-finals of the 2013 edition of Thai Fight's -70 kg/154 lb tournament in Thailand on October 23, 2013. Then he proceeded in semi finals and lost to Expedito Valin on November 30, 2013.

Accomplishments 

WFCA Full Contact Kickboxing World Champion.
WFCA Muay Thai World Champion.
4 times WAKO World Champion.
ISKA World -70 kg Championship.
ISKA European Champion.
K-1 Max Spain Champion 2004.
2 time European Kickboxing Champion.
Kickboxing champion of Spain.
Spanish Full Contact Kickboxing Champion.
2 time Iberian Kickboxing Champion.
Iberian Full Contact Kickboxing Champion.
Multiple time Spanish Karate Champion of Spain, 3rd Dan.
Cantabrian Amateur Kickboxing Champion.
Spanish Amateur Kickboxing Champion.
Spanish Neoprofessional Kickboxing Champion.
Spanish Amateur Full Contact Kickboxing Champion.

Kickboxing record 

|-
|-  bgcolor="#FFBBBB"
| 2014-11-15 || Loss ||align=left| Marat Grigorian || Topking World Series 2 – 70 kg Tournament, Final 16|| Paris, France || Decision || 3 ||3:00 
|-
|-  bgcolor="#FFBBBB"
| 2013-11-30 ||Loss ||align=left| Expedito Valin || 2013 Thai Fight -70 kg/154 lb Tournament, Semi-finals || Bangkok, Thailand ||Decision ||3 ||3:00 
|-
|-  bgcolor="#CCFFCC"
| 2013-10-23 || Win ||align=left| Emmanuel Horta Tavares || 2013 Thai Fight -70 kg/154 lb Tournament, Quarter-finals || Bangkok, Thailand || KO (left hook to the body) || 1 || 
|-
|-  bgcolor="#CCFFCC"
| 2013-07-13 || Win ||align=left| Elam Ngor || Enfusion Live: Tenerife || Tenerife, Spain || DQ (Ngor left the ring) || 3 || 3:00  
|-  bgcolor="#CCFFCC"
| 2013-03-09 || Win ||align=left| Artur Kyshenko || Enfusion Live: Barcelona || Barcelona, Spain || Decision (split) || 3 || 3:00 
|-  bgcolor="#CCFFCC"
| 2013-02-03 || Win ||align=left| Giga Chikadze  || Street Culture Fight Night 2 || Tenerife, Spain || KO (back kick) || 1 ||  
|-  bgcolor="#CCFFCC"
| 2012-12-15 || Win ||align=left| Xu Yan || K-1 World MAX 2012 World Championship Tournament Final, Reserve Bout || Athens, Greece || Decision (Unanimous) || 3 || 3:00 
|-  bgcolor="#FFBBBB"
| 2012-05-27 || Loss ||align=left| Andy Souwer || K-1 World MAX 2012 World Championship Tournament Final 16 || Madrid, Spain || Decision (Split) || 3 || 3:00
|-  bgcolor="#CCFFCC"
| 2012-04-14 || Win ||align=left| Albert Kraus || Born To Fight || Torrelavega, Spain || Decision || 3 || 3:00 
|- bgcolor="#FFBBBB"
| 2012-01-21 || Loss ||align=left| Giorgio Petrosyan || Yokkao Extreme 2012 || Milan, Italy || Decision (unanimous) || 3 || 3:00
|- bgcolor="#FFBBBB"
| 2011-11-27 || Loss ||align=left| Frank Giorgi || Thai Fight 2011 70 kg Tournament, Semi-finals || Bangkok, Thailand || Decision || 3 || 3:00
|-  bgcolor="#CCFFCC"
| 2011-09-25 || Win ||align=left| José Barradas || Thai Fight || Bangkok, Thailand || Decision || 3 || 3:00
|-  bgcolor="#CCFFCC"
| 2011-05-16 || Win ||align=left| Gago Drago || Fix Events & Fightclub Group presents: It's Showtime 2011 || Madrid, Spain || Decision (Split) || 3 || 3:00
|-  bgcolor="#CCFFCC"
| 2011-02-05 || Win ||align=left| Andy Souwer || El Desafio K-1 Rules || Málaga, Spain || Decision || 3 ||3:00
|-  bgcolor="#CCFFCC"
| 2010-05-16 || Win ||align=left| Gil Silva || || Camargo, Spain || Decision || 5 || 
|-  bgcolor="#CCFFCC"
| 2010-03-06 || Win ||align=left| Mickael Lallemand || Apocalipsis V || Torrelavega, Spain || KO || 2 ||  
|-  bgcolor="#CCFFCC"
| 2009-06-13 || Win ||align=left| Chris van Venrooij || Apocalipsis IV || Bilbao, Spain || Decision || 5 || 3:00 
|- bgcolor="#FFBBBB"
| 2009-05-02 || Loss ||align=left| Sak Kaoponlek || S-1 Muay Thai || Italy || Decision || || 
|-  bgcolor="#CCFFCC"
| 2009-04-11 || Win ||align=left| Tim Thomas || || Laredo, Spain || KO || 7 || 
|-
! style=background:white colspan=9 |
|-
|-  bgcolor="#CCFFCC"
| 2009-02-20 || Win ||align=left| Rafi Zouheir || || Madrid, Spain || Decision || 5 || 3:00
|-  bgcolor="#CCFFCC"
| 2008-12-06 || Win ||align=left| Diogo Calado || || Tenerife, Spain || Decision || 5 || 2:00
|-  bgcolor="#CCFFCC"
| 2008-11-15 || Win ||align=left| Saro Presti || Apocalipsis III || Bilbao, Spain || KO || ||  
|-  bgcolor="#CCFFCC"
| 2008-10-12 || Win ||align=left| Jose Miguel García || The War || Barcelona, Spain || Decision || 5 || 2:00
|- bgcolor="#FFBBBB"
| 2008-05-10 || Loss ||align=left| Mohammed Rahhaoui || || Torrelavega, Spain || Decision || 5 || 3:00
|-
! style=background:white colspan=9 |
|-
|-  bgcolor="#CCFFCC"
| 2007-12-07 || Win ||align=left| Franck Pétin || || Saint-Quentin, France || KO || 7 || 
|-
! style=background:white colspan=9 |
|-
|-  bgcolor="#CCFFCC"
| 2007-06-30 || Win ||align=left| Kit Sitphonlek || || Santander, Spain || Decision || 5 || 3:00 
|-
! style=background:white colspan=9 |
|-
|-  bgcolor="#CCFFCC"
| 2007-06-02 || Win ||align=left| Kamal Chabrani || Torneo Apocalipsis II, Final || Bilbao, Spain || Decision || ||  
|-
! style=background:white colspan=9 |
|-
|-  bgcolor="#CCFFCC"
| 2007-06-02 || Win ||align=left| Sylvain Ginon || Torneo Apocalipsis II, Semi-finals || Bilbao, Spain || Decision || ||  
|-  bgcolor="#CCFFCC"
| 2007-06-02 || Win ||align=left| Chris van Venrooij || Torneo Apocalipsis II, Quarter-finals || Bilbao, Spain || Decision || ||  
|- bgcolor="#FFBBBB"
| 2007-04-08 || Loss ||align=left| Marco Piqué || Balans Fight Night || Tilburg, Netherlands || TKO (corner stoppage) || 1 ||  
|-  bgcolor="#CCFFCC"
| 2007-02-03 || Win ||align=left| Nicolas Cabello ||  || Barcelona, Spain || KO || 2 ||  
|-  bgcolor="#CCFFCC"
| 2006-12-02 || Win ||align=left| Kevin Harper || || Torrelavega, Spain || Decision || 5 || 
|-
! style=background:white colspan=9 |
|-
|-  bgcolor="#c5d2ea"
| 2006-06-17 || Draw ||align=left| Luis Reis || Apocalipsis I || Bilbao, Spain || Decision || 5 || 2:00
|-  bgcolor="#CCFFCC"
| 2006-05-20 || Win ||align=left| Radhouane Amoulibi ||  || Paris, France || KO || 1 ||  
|-
! style=background:white colspan=9 |
|-
|-  bgcolor="#c5d2ea"
| 2006-02-19 || Draw ||align=left| Ibrahim Tamazaev || || Torrelavega, Spain || Decision || 5 || 3:00
|-
! style=background:white colspan=9 |
|-
|-  bgcolor="#CCFFCC"
| 2005-10-22 || Win ||align=left| Wallid Haddad || || Torrelavega, Spain || Decision || || 
|-
! style=background:white colspan=9 |
|-
|-  bgcolor="#CCFFCC"
| 2005-06-18 || Win ||align=left| Randell Handel || W.K.N. Full Contact Tournament || || || || 
|-  bgcolor="#CCFFCC"
| 2004-12-18 || Win ||align=left| Luis Reis || K-1 MAX Spain 2004, Final || Guadalajara, Spain || Decision || 3 || 3:00
|-
! style=background:white colspan=9 |
|-
|-  bgcolor="#CCFFCC"
| 2004-12-18 || Win ||align=left| Willy Borrel || K-1 MAX Spain 2004, Semi-finals || Guadalajara, Spain || KO || || 
|-  bgcolor="#CCFFCC"
| 2004-12-18 || Win ||align=left| Antonio Postigo || K-1 MAX Spain 2004, Quarter-finals || Guadalajara, Spain || KO ||  ||  
|-  bgcolor="#CCFFCC"
| 2001 || Win ||align=left| Riad Rekis || || || || || 
|-  bgcolor="#CCFFCC"
| 2000-05-13 || Win ||align=left| Alain Dumas || || Torrelavega, Spain || KO || 5 || 
|-
! style=background:white colspan=9 |
|-
|-  bgcolor="#CCFFCC"
| 1998 || Win ||align=left| Rafael Del Toro || || || Decision || 7 ||  
|-

References 

1978 births
Living people
Martial artists from Cantabria
Spanish male kickboxers
Welterweight kickboxers
Spanish male karateka
Spanish Muay Thai practitioners
20th-century Spanish people
21st-century Spanish people